Theodore Johnson (May 5, 1903 – December 1992) was a Democratic member of the Pennsylvania House of Representatives.

He was born in Georgia to William Edward and Mary (née Collins) Johnson.

References

Democratic Party members of the Pennsylvania House of Representatives
1903 births
People from Mount Vernon, Georgia
1992 deaths
20th-century American politicians